Aghmiyun (also Romanized as Āghmīyūn, Āghmeyūn, Aghmeyūn, Āghmīūn, and Āgh Mīyūn) is a village in Aghmiyun Rural District of the Central District of Sarab County, East Azerbaijan province, Iran. At the 2006 National Census, its population was 1,493 in 395 households. The following census in 2011 counted 1,378 people in 404 households. The latest census in 2016 showed a population of 1,234 people in 402 households; it was the largest village in its rural district.

References 

Sarab County

Populated places in East Azerbaijan Province

Populated places in Sarab County